Yaylakent can refer to:

 Yaylakent, Çayırlı
 Yaylakent, Orta